John Bourne may refer to:

John Cooke Bourne (1814–1896), English artist and engraver
John Bourne (artist) (born 1943), British artist and painter
John Bourne (cricketer) (1872–1952), English cricketer
Sir John Bourne (died 1575), MP for Guildford, Midhurst, Worcester, Worcestershire and Preston
John Bourne (died 1558), MP for Reading

See also
Jonathan Bourne Jr. (1855–1940), U.S. senator
Sir John Bourn (1934–2022), British former civil servant